A pressure shadow (also called strain shadow) is a term used in metamorphic geology to describe a microstructure in deformed rocks that occurs adjacent to a relatively large, undeformed particle, such as a porphyroclast. Pressure shadows often appear in thin sections as pairs of roughly triangular regions that are elongated parallel to the foliation around a clast of a different mineral. Pressure shadows that contain fibrous mineral textures are also termed pressure fringes or strain fringes.

Formation 
During deformation, minerals can migrate by plastic flow or may grow by diffusive mass transport into the lower-stress regions created by a rigid porphyroclast or porphyroblast.

References 

Metamorphic petrology
Structural geology